Mississippi Highway 475 (MS 475) is a highway in central Mississippi. Its southern terminus is at MS 468. It then travels north to Jackson–Evers International Airport, and ends at MS 25 just north of it.

Route description
MS 475 starts at its intersection with MS 468 near the unincorporated area of Greenfield. The road travels north through rural Rankin County and enters the city of Pearl. The route travels through a commercialized area and changes to a divided highway. MS 475 intersects Interstate 20 (I-20) at a diamond interchange and then travels to its at-grade intersection with US 80 soon after. The highway intersects Old Brandon Road at a diamond interchange, with an extra ramp that leads to the airport's entrance. The road travels adjacent to the airport until its intersection at MS 468. MS 475 ends at MS 25 in northeast Flowood.

Major intersections

References

External links

475
Transportation in Rankin County, Mississippi